A. R. Morlan (January 3, 1958 – January 4/5, 2016; née, Arlette Renee Morlan, later, Ana Rose Morlan; pseudonyms Renee M. Charles, Ana Rose Morlan, and Karl Rene Moore) was an American author of novels and short stories whose works of fiction have appeared in anthologies. She wrote in various genres includes horror, science fiction, vampire, erotica, and gay erotica.

Early life
Arlette Renee Morlan was born in Chicago, Illinois, January 3, 1958. From 1961 to 1969, she lived in Los Angeles, California. Morlan described a troubled childhood in a 2014 interview. Her mother and maternal grandmother had isolated her and terrorized her. After Morlan's mother lost custody of Arlette, the mother took Arlette to a different state and for fifty years, Arlette was out of contact with her father.

Morlan graduated from Mount Senario College in Ladysmith, Wisconsin, in 1980.

Career

Morlan's first story, "Four Days Before the Snow", was published in 1985. More short stories and novels followed, including The Amulet (1991) and Dark Journey (1991). Her story "Yet Another Poisoned Apple for the Princess" appeared in a well-reviewed anthology, The Year's Best Fantasy and Horror (1994), alongside works by Neil Gaiman, Ellen Datlow, Geoffrey Landis, and Terri Windling. Morlan was nominated for a Tiptree Award in 1998, for "The Hetairai Turncoat", published under the pseudonym Karl-Rene Moore.

In the 1990s, she worked for the Writer's Digest as an instructor for correspondence courses, but with a changing market brought on by technology, she was dropped by this employer. Morlan had "no computer, no Internet, and no cell phone". She also did not have a driver's license. Describing herself as being "totally computer illiterate", she worked on a typewriter and used carbon paper to produce a duplicate copy of her writings.

By 2000, Morlan had published 93 works of short fiction. Several of her collections were published, such as Smothered Dolls (2006), Ewerton Death Trip (2011), and Homely in the Cradle and Other Stories (2015). She used various pen names for her science fiction and horror works, including Renee M. Charles and Ana Rose Morlan, eventually changing her legal name to the latter. Her erotica works were published as Renee M. Charles, while her gay erotica publications were under the pseudonym, Karl Rene Moore. Morlan was influenced by Mary Shelley, Ursula K. Le Guin, and Alice Sheldon.

Personal life
Morlan had dyslexia, arthritis and Asperger syndrome. She cared for dozens of cats at a time. In mid-2015, she was charged with cashing her mother's social security checks dating back to 2011.

She was found dead at her home in Ladysmith, Wisconsin, on January 6, 2016, in an apparent suicide, which occurred one or two days before. She was 58.

Selected works
 Dark Journey, Bantam Spectra, 1991, 
  The Amulet, Bantam Books, 1991, 
 Smothered Dolls, Overlook Connection Press, 2006, 
 Ewerton Death Trip: A Walk Through the Dark Side of Town, Borgo Press / Wildside Press, 2011, 
 Rillas and Other Science Fiction Stories, Borgo Press / Wildside Press, 2012, 
 Of Vampires & Gentlemen: Tales of Erotic Horror, Borgo Press / Wildside Press, 2012, 
 The Chimera and the Shadowfox Griefer and Other Curious People, Borgo Press / Wildside Press, 2012, 
 The Fold-O-Rama Wars at the Blue Moon Roach Hotel and Other Colorful Tales of Transformation and Tattoos, Borgo Press / Wildside Press, 2012 
 The Hemingway Kittens and Other Feline Fancies and Fantasies, Borgo Press / Wildside Press, 2013, 
 Homely in the Cradle and Other Stories, Wildside Press, 2015, 
 The A.R. Morlan Megapack, Wildside Press, 2015, 
 The Bone-God's Lair and Other Tales of the Famous and the Infamous, Wildside Press, 2016,

References

1958 births
2016 suicides
20th-century American women writers
20th-century American writers
21st-century American women writers
21st-century American writers
American erotica writers
American horror novelists
American science fiction writers
LGBT erotica
Mount Senario College alumni
People from Ladysmith, Wisconsin
People with Asperger syndrome
Suicides in Wisconsin
Women erotica writers
Writers from Chicago
20th-century pseudonymous writers
21st-century pseudonymous writers
Pseudonymous women writers
20th-century American short story writers
21st-century American short story writers
20th-century American novelists
21st-century American novelists